Jacob Green (February 2, 1722 – May 24, 1790) was a Presbyterian pastor and acting president of Princeton University. A resident of Hanover, Green was also the delegate for Morris County to the fourth assembly of the Provincial Congress of New Jersey in 1776 and served as chairman of the constitutional committee.

Born in Malden, Massachusetts, Green grew up in a Calvinist community and family. He attended Harvard College after an unsuccessful attempt at vocational training, graduating in 1740. His time in college significantly influenced his religious beliefs and was reborn while there. Following his graduation, he was to take a position at Bethesda Academy with George Whitefield, but when that fell through, he was persuaded to become a Presbyterian minister. He became a pastor for Hanover Presbyterian Church, a position he would serve for 44 years. Due to a poor salary, he would undertake various other jobs through his life, with his career as a physician lasting for over 30 years. He was a founding trustee of Princeton and served as acting president for a consecutive eight months. 

Green would marry twice and have a combined 10 kids. He was the father of Ashbel Green, eighth president of Princeton University. Green died in 1790 from influenza and was buried in Hanover Presbyterian Church Cemetery.

Early life 
Jacob Green was born on February 2, 1722, in Malden, Massachusetts. His father, also named Jacob Green, was a poor farmer who died about 18 months after his birth from a "nervous fever". Due to his father's death, the responsibility of raising Green fell to his mother, Dorothy Lynde Green and an assortment of uncles and sisters. He moved several times through his youth, resulting in him living with various family members. At fourteen, Green went to find vocational work, but after an unsuccessful search for a suitable trade, he began preparing for college on the advice of his brother-in-law; no one in Green's family had attended college before. To gather funds, he got a probate court to approve an arrangement to sell land inherited from his father's estate. To prepare academically, Green spent a year and a half at a grammar school learning Latin, a standard practice at the time for those interested in attending college.

Harvard education 

Green enrolled at Harvard College in the summer of 1740 at the age of 18 and a half. Green recounted his college experience as demanding, though he placed this feeling on his excessive studying. Moreover, he was a studious student who avoided trouble, winning three scholarships and becoming Scholar of the House while there. At Harvard, he intensely studied theology and was member of a small religious society that met weekly. In his junior year, he began a personal diary that he continued for over 40 years. He graduated from Harvard in July 1744 in a class of thirty. Afterwards, he wished to pursue advanced studies but was too poor, so he accepted a teaching position at a school in Sutton, Massachusetts, for one year.

Religion 
Throughout the early years of his life, Green was constantly confronted by religion. His household was pious, and his sisters would audibly read religious tracts to him. In Malden, he received much religious education from the local Congregationalist church which instilled strict Congregationalism throughout the town. Though, the biggest religious influence on Green came from the books he read. Malden had a connection to one of the most prominent literary critics in New England, Michael Wigglesworth, as he was the former minister for the town. Wiggleworth's best-selling poem The Day of Doom was read frequently in the Green household. The poem was also reprinted in the New England Primer, the quintessential textbook at the time for the region, which Green read from. It had a profound effect on Green's fear towards judgement day, believing he was destined for hell.

While at Harvard, Green was significantly influenced by sermons given by Gilbert Tennet and George Whitefield at Harvard. He strongly supported Whitefield's criticisms of Harvard straying from Calvinism and backed the goals of the Great Awakening. Green was among a group of Harvard students that followed Whitefield on his religious tour of nearby towns, making it as far as Leicester in western Massachusetts. Before returning to Harvard, he visited his mother one last time before her death. Tennet's arrival in Cambridge in late January 1741 stirred Green even more towards Calvinism than Whitefield. He was reborn two months after Tennet's sermon through study, though he struggled through the remainder of college to maintain his conversion in face of Englightenment teachings.

Ministry 

In the summer of 1745, Green intended to follow Whitefield to Georgia to take a position at his orphanage, Bethesda Academy. However, upon meeting Whitefield in Elizabethtown, New Jersey, at Jonathan Dickinson's home, he was informed by Whitefield that he could not be offered a position due to a paucity of funds.

Green then consulted with Presbyterian leaders Jonathan Dickinson and Aaron Burr Sr., who suggested the idea of becoming a Presbyterian minister in New Jersey. After consulting with others and additional encouragement by Burr, he agreed to the proposition. His first assignment was the pastorship for the Hanover Presbyterian Church located in Morris County, New Jersey. In September 1745, he was licensed to preach and began a year-long trial, which culminated with him being ordained and installed as pastor of Hanover Presbyterian Church in November 1746. He remained as pastor for 44 years. His congregation agreed to build Green and his family a parsonage in 1754 and would finish construction in 1758; Green would live there for the rest of his life.

College of New Jersey 
While Green was a devoted minister, he continued his studying, gaining a reputation for his general knowledge and his skill in Hebrew. He was a founding trustee of the College of New Jersey—now Princeton University—in 1748 and served as acting president for a period of eight consecutive months between Jonathan Edwards' death and the arrival of Samuel Davies. He resigned as trustee in 1764.

In 1774, Green built and established a Latin school, where he taught at with eight others, including his son Ashbel. One of those he taught was Mahlon Dickerson, future governor and senator of New Jersey.

Money issues 
Green complained of his salary as pastor being too little to sustain his family, leading to dissatisfaction and anger with his congregation. This necessitated his pursuing other jobs, like farming, speculating on real estate, and distilling. When he purchased a gristmill, it angered members of his congregation and ignited a tense relationship. He eventually compromised, promising to consult with them prior to undertaking "secular" jobs. To resolve his money problems, they agreed to him becoming a physician, a common job for preachers. While he received no formal training, he learned from watching other doctors and studying medical textbooks. He would remain one for over thirty years. His efforts would resolve his debts and by the time of his death, his estate was valued at double the average estate in Hanover.

Later life and death 
Green died in May 1790 from influenza he contracted at a religious gathering at his church in Hanover. He is buried in Hanover Presbyterian Church Cemetery, along with both his first and second wife; his grave features a lengthy epitaph written by Ashbel Green.

Personal life and family 
Green's great-grandfather was Thomas Green, who was one of the first settlers from England. His grandfather, Henry Green, had eight children, with Jacob's father, born in 1689, being the youngest. The Green family was predominantly one of Puritan farmers and craftsmen; Malden served as the geographic center for the family. When Green's father died, his mother remarried to John Barrett, though it is considered that Green and his stepfather did not have a strong relationship due to no mention by Green of him in his autobiography. On the contrary, Green cited his mother Dorothy as influential to his love of learning and interest in religion. 

He married his first wife, Anna Strong, in 1747, though she died in November 1756 from tuberculosis; they had four children. Anna's death would strengthen Green's faith and increase his spiritual outreach in his Hanover congregation. He married again in 1757 to Elizabeth Pierseon, who died in 1810, and had six children, with his most notable being Ashbel Green, the eighth president of Princeton University. While Green did not practice primogeniture like many other English descendants with his children, he did favor his sons over his daughters, as only his sons would receive land. His parenting style was conventional for the time.

Bibliography

Autobiography 
Green wrote an autobiography that was published in The Christian Advocate, a religious journal edited by his son Ashbel. While Green wrote most of it, Ashbel filled in parts from his own memory.

Pamphlets

Articles 
Articles written by Green were featured in the New Jersey Journal, a revolutionary-era newspaper, under the pen name of "Eumenes." 
  Chatham, New Jersey
  Chatham, New Jersey
  Chatham, New Jersey

Published sermons

See also 

 Slavery in New Jersey

Notes

References

Citations

Works cited

Further reading 

 

1722 births
1790 deaths
People from Malden, Massachusetts
People from Morris County, New Jersey
People of colonial New Jersey
Harvard College alumni
Presidents of Princeton University
18th-century American clergy
American Presbyterian ministers